The Women's Super League Hall of Fame (WSL Hall of Fame) honours the leading association football players and coaches that have played or managed in the Women's Super League (previously known as the FA WSL; FA Women's Super League), the top level of the English football league system. Inaugurated in 2021, the Hall of Fame, was launched to concide with the 10th anniversary of the league following its inception in April 2011. It is intended to recognise and honour players and individuals that who have contributed to the growth of the women's game in England and the WSL since its founding.

In September 2021, as part of the inaugural class of 2021, three players were inducted; Fara Williams, Rachel Yankey, Kelly Smith and one manager, Emma Hayes. The next year, a further three players were inducted.

Eligibility requirements 
Those eligible for induction into the FA WSL Hall of Fame, include retired players, both active and retired coaches and active or retired match officials. The one thing they must all have "in common, is the positive impact and legacy" they have left on the league since the inception of the FA WSL in 2011. Their selected is only judged on their domestic performances in the FA WSL with no other competitions considered.

To assist the selection panel in selecting their inductee nominations, the following standards have been established:

 Players - Players must have participated in the Women's Super League (WSL) for at least three years and have made a major contribution to the league, whether as a champion, a team leader, or an exceptional individual player (or via her individual performances / individual accolades).
 Coaches - Coaches must have won a league championship or coached in the league for at least three years. The individual must have had a huge impact on the league, whether it was through winning the competition or nurturing new talent (youth development).
 Officials - Officials must have contributed significantly to the league during their tenure as officials and to have upheld a high standard of refereeing to support the Women's Super League's standards, integrity, and professionalism.

Inductees

Players by nationality

References 
General

 

Specific

English football trophies and awards
History of football in England
Association football museums and halls of fame
Lists of English sportspeople
Halls of fame in England
2021 establishments in England
2021 in British sport
2021 in association football
Women's Super League awards
English women's football trophies and awards